Exmetjan Ekber (born 17 January 1993) is a Chinese footballer.

Club career
Exmetjan started his professional football career in 2012 when he was promoted to China League Two side Xinjiang Begonia's squad. He scored three goals in twenty-two appearances in the 2012 season. However, he became an unattached player after Xinjiang quit from the league in 2013 due to financial difficulties. He was included China League One club Xinjiang Tianshan Leopard's reserve team squad in 2014.

Exmetjan was signed by China League One side Yanbian Changbaishan on 28 February 2015 after a successful trial. He made his debut for Yanbian on 16 April 2015 in a 2015 Chinese FA Cup match against amateur team Suzhou Jinfu. He played just one minute in the 2015 China League One as Yanbian won the title of the league and promoted to the first tier. On 16 July 2016, Exmetjan made his Super League debut in a 3–0 home victory against Jiangsu Suning, coming on for Jin Bo in the 76th minute. He scored his first goal for Yanbian one minute after his substitution.

On 22 February 2018, Exmetjan transferred to China League One club Nei Mongol Zhongyou following the relegation of Yanbian Funde.

Career statistics
Statistics accurate as of match played 31 December 2019.

Honours
Yanbian FC
 China League One: 2015

References

External links
 

1993 births
Living people
Uyghur sportspeople
People from Kashgar
Chinese footballers
Chinese people of Uyghur descent
Footballers from Xinjiang
Association football midfielders
Yanbian Funde F.C. players
Inner Mongolia Zhongyou F.C. players
Chinese Super League players
China League One players
China League Two players
21st-century Chinese people